Úrsula Murayama ( born 1972 in Mexico City, Mexico) is a Mexican actress. She currently lives in Spain.

Biography and career 
Murayama is the best known for the role of Jacinta in Esmeralda (1997). The main heroine of this telenovela, Esmeralda, was played by Leticia Calderón. In Esmeralda also appeared Noé Murayama.

It is possible that he was a relative of Úrsula.

She also appeared in Rosalinda (1999). The main heroine in this telenovela, Rosalinda Pérez Romero, was played by Thalía.

Her other roles were in:
Hijos del viento – Princess Tizcuitl
Sin Azul – Laura
Mi hijo Arturo
Las 13 rosas
Yacaranday
Tres veces Sofía
Romántica Obsesión
Morir dos veces
Pelea de gallos – Dolores
El caso Wanninkhof
 Padre no hay más que uno

Hijos del viento is a film about one Aztec princess, called Tizcuitl.

In Sin Azul, Úrsula played Laura, who after a painful miscarriage journeys to her grandmother's town in search of a remedy to heal her trauma in Xochimilco.

See also 
 Japanese community of Mexico City

External links 

Úrsula with Ignacio López Tarso
Úrsula Murayama’s acting

References

1972 births
Living people
Mexican telenovela actresses
Mexican television actresses
Mexican film actresses
Mexican stage actresses
Actresses from Mexico City
20th-century Mexican actresses
21st-century Mexican actresses
Mexican people of Japanese descent
Mexican emigrants to Spain
People from Mexico City
Actresses of Japanese descent